Liqizhuangnan station, is a station of Line 5 of the Tianjin Metro. It started operations on 7 December 2021.

References

Railway stations in Tianjin
Railway stations in China opened in 2021
Tianjin Metro stations